Jarmo Tapio Hakala (born January 6, 1954 in Tampere) is a Finnish sprint canoer who competed in the early 1980s. At the 1980 Summer Olympics in Moscow, he was eliminated in the semifinals of both the C-2 500 m event and the C-2 1000 m event.

References
 Sports-Reference.com profile

1954 births
Living people
Canoeists from Tampere
Canoeists at the 1980 Summer Olympics
Finnish male canoeists
Olympic canoeists of Finland